Mahrinu (also Romanized as Māhrīnū; also known as Mārīnū) is a village in Kavirat Rural District, Chatrud District, Kerman County, Kerman Province, Iran. At the 2006 census, its population was 30, in 7 families.

References 

Populated places in Kerman County